Alfred Dudley Turner (24 August 1854 – 7 May 1888) was an American composer, mainly of chamber music.  He was born in St. Albans, Maine, and died there.  Turner was a graduate, and for many years, instructor at the Boston University College of Music.  Also was an instructor at the New England Conservatory.

External links

References
 John Tasker Howard (1890–1964), Our American Music: Three  Hundred Years of It, Thomas Y. Crowell Company, New York (1939)

Inline citations

1854 births
1888 deaths
American male composers
People from St. Albans, Maine
19th-century American composers
19th-century American male musicians